Viktor Weißenbacher (15 July 1897 – 18 December 1956) was a German international footballer.

References

1897 births
1956 deaths
Association football forwards
German footballers
Germany international footballers
1. FC Pforzheim players